The Dhangadhi Premier League (DPL) is a franchise Twenty20 cricket league in Nepal. The league was founded by the Dhangadhi Cricket Academy and Sudur Pashchim Academy in 2017.

The DPL season runs between the months of March and April, with each team playing 5 matches in round-robin format; the top 4 teams with the best record qualify for the Playoffs and culminates in the final.

The current DPL title holders are Team Chauraha Dhangadhi, who won the 2017 season and 2018 Season.

Teams

Current

Former

Results

Season results

Teams' results

See also 
 Everest Premier League
 Pokhara Premier League

References

External links

 
Cricket in Nepal
Nepalese domestic cricket competitions
Recurring sporting events established in 2017
Sports leagues established in 2017
Twenty20 cricket leagues
2017 establishments in Nepal